Dragonkeeper is a fantasy novel written by Australian author Carole Wilkinson. It is one of the first books from the Dragonkeeper series, which consists of six books (two trilogies) and a prequel. The second book is called Garden of the Purple Dragon and the third book is called Dragon Moon. In the second trilogy of the series, there is the 4th book which is called Blood Brothers, then Shadow Sister and finally Bronze Bird Tower. There is also a prequel to the original Dragonkeeper novel known as Dragon Dawn.  

The novel is set in ancient China. Ping is a slave girl for the evil master Lan, saves the life of an aging dragon and escapes her brutal master. Pursued by a ruthless dragon hunter, the girl and the dragon make an epic journey across China carrying a mysterious stone that must be protected. This is a story of a young slave girl who believes she is not worthy of a name but finds within herself the strength and courage to make this perilous journey, and do what must be done.

Plot introduction 

In the far western mountains of the Han Empire in ancient China, a young slave girl is used, abused and neglected by the cruel Master Lan, whose job is to care for the two aged imperial dragons, Long Danzi and Lu Yu. Nameless and alone, the slave girl is without hope and her only friend is her pet rat, Hua. After Lu Yu suddenly dies, the slave girl feels guilty and responsible.

When the girl discovers that the Emperor intends to sell the one remaining dragon, Danzi, to a dragon hunter to be butchered, she and the dragon escape from Huangling together. Long Danzi tells the girl her true name, Ping, and asks her to accompany him to the ocean. She must protect a mysterious stone that is vital to the dragon's legacy. Along the way, they meet Wang Cao, a herbalist previously acquainted with Danzi. The dragon hunter, Diao, catches up with them in a rural village, and though they manage to escape, Diao seizes the stone.

Danzi and Ping travel via the Yellow River to Wucheng, a town of sorcerers, to recover the stone. They find the stone in the possession of a necromancer and reacquire it. Danzi teaches Ping how to use qi (psychic energy) and explains to Ping that she is the hereditary Dragon Keeper. However, before she can respond, their boat collides with an imperial yacht, and Ping and Danzi are taken into custody at the Emperor's hunting lodge. The Emperor, Liu Che, befriends Ping. Liu Che invites a group of lore masters to the lodge. Wang Cao is one of them. He drugs Ping, convinces Danzi that he is the true Dragon Keeper, and escapes with him and the dragon stone.

Seeing Ping heartbroken, Liu Che invites her to climb Tai Shang Mountain with him. At the peak, Ping realizes that Wang Cao and Danzi are also on Tai Shang, with Diao attacking them. Diao kills Wang Cao, but Ping and Hua arrive. Ping uses qi to defeat Diao, though Hua is mortally wounded. Danzi reconciles with Ping, and the two fly the final leg of their journey to the coast. However, Ping drops the dragon stone while in flight, and it cracks on impact with the ground. It releases a baby dragon, and Ping realizes that the dragon stone was Lu Yu's last egg. Leaving his son in Ping's care, Danzi bids Ping farewell and flies across the ocean to the Isle Of The Blest, where he and Hua can be healed.

Main characters
 Ping, a slave girl who was the first-ever female Dragon Keeper. She was nameless before she met Long Danzi. She was also the proper dragon keeper.
 Hua, a rat Ping carries around with her. Her only friend before she meets Long Danzi. Danzi disliked Hua until Hua ate a centipede that crawled into Danzi's ear.
 Long Danzi, an ancient green dragon; the last wild imperial dragon in the Han Empire. He travels with Ping to the ocean where he takes a mysterious stone, but he won't explain to Ping what it is. His name means 'courageous dragon'
 Long Kai Duan, a baby dragon, son of Long Danzi and Lu Yu. The dragon stone is the egg of Kai. His name means 'Beginning'
 Lu Yu, Danzi's mate and the mother of Kai Duan, who dies early in the book from misery.
 Master Lan, Ping's master, a lazy and cruel man and false Dragon Keeper.
 Diao, a dragon hunter who hunts Long Danzi throughout the novel for the dragon's body and his stone.
 Wang Cao, a herbalist who used to be Long Danzi's companion until they were separated by Imperial soldiers.
 Jiang Bing, a boat woman secretly working with the Necromancer.
 " The Necromancer", Necromancer who had possession of the dragon stone and has an evil desire for it. He acquires it from Diao after Ping and Long Danzi lose it.
 Liu Che, Young Emperor of China and Ping's friend for a short while. His father died after eating the Dragon Pickle of Lu Yu, Danzi's mate who died because of misery like most of the other imperial dragons.
 Tian Fen, The Emperor's Counsellor, who was present at Huangling Palace when an order was introduced to execute Ping on sight

Lao Ma, don't forget about her.

Film adaptation
In 2017, a CGI animated film based on the books has been announced and is now in the works with Sergio Pablos leading the early visual development from The SPA Studios. It is a Spain-chinese production with the animation being done by China Film Animation, Base FX, and Ilion Animation Studios. Produced by Manuel Cristobal, Larry Levene, Huang Jun, Gabriel Arias-Salgado, Axel Kuschevatzky, Mikel Lejarza and Mercedes Gamero, the film is directed by Ignacio Ferreras and co-directed by Zhang Bo with the screenplay will be written by Ferreras, Carole Wilkinson, Rosanna Cecchini, Pablo Castrillo and Xiamping Wang. The score will be composed by Zhiyi Wang while the film will be released around Summer 2023.

Awards
 2003 Best Young Adult Book Aurealis Awards - winner.
 2004 Children's Book Council of Australia Book of the Year (Younger Readers) - winner.
 2004 Queensland Premier's Literary Best Children's Book Award - winner.
 2004 NSW Premier's Literary Awards - shortlist.
 2006 Kids Own Australian Literary Awards (KOALA) Older Readers - winner.
 2006 Kalbacher Klapperschlange Award (Germany) - winner.
 2006 Canberra's Own Outstanding List (COOL) Award - shortlist.

References

External links 

 Official Dragonkeeper homepage
 Publisher's microsite for the Dragonkeeper series
 Publisher's Dragonkeeper page
 How to be a Dragonkeeper: Inspired by the novel

2003 novels
Aurealis Award-winning works
Dragonkeeper books
2003 children's books